BeaTunes is a commercial software package for Microsoft Windows and Mac OS X, developed and distributed by tagtraum industries incorporated. It originally started as a tool for detecting the BPM in music managed by Apple's iTunes. Since version 3, beaTunes is not dependent on iTunes anymore and supports Harmonic mixing and Beatmixing through BPM and key detection. Keys are displayed in either their musical notation or in Open Key Notation.

See also 
Harmonic mixing
Beatmixing
Music Theory
DJing

External links
 Official website

Audio mixing software
Proprietary cross-platform software